Transcendental Étude No. 3 in F major, "Paysage" (Scenery), is the third of twelve Transcendental Études by Franz Liszt. It is generally considered to be one of the less difficult studies.

The piece suggests a peaceful country scene. It is said that Liszt got the idea of writing this étude while watching the scenery change during a train ride. The first section is played poco adagio with a sempre legato e placido indication at the start. There are gentle arpeggios and constant dynamic changes and syncopation, and the melody is often played in thirds or octaves.

External links 
 

Transcendental 03
1852 compositions
Compositions in F major